Aegopinella is a genus of small, air-breathing land snails, terrestrial pulmonate gastropod mollusks in the family Gastrodontidae, the glass snails.

Species
Species in the genus Aegopinella include:
 Aegopinella cisalpina A. Riedel, 1983
 † Aegopinella denudata (Reuss in Reuss & Meyer, 1849) 
 † Aegopinella depressula Harzhauser & Neubauer, 2018 
 Aegopinella epipedostoma (Fagot, 1879)
 † Aegopinella erecta (Gottschick, 1920) 
 Aegopinella forcarti A. Riedel, 1983
 Aegopinella graziadei (Boeckel, 1940)
 † Aegopinella lozeki Schlickum, 1975 
 † Aegopinella lozekiana Stworzewicz, 1976 
 Aegopinella minor (Stabile, 1864)
 Aegopinella nitens (Michaud, 1831)
 Aegopinella nitidula (Draparnaud, 1805)
 † Aegopinella procellaria (Jooss, 1918) 
 Aegopinella pura (Alder, 1830)
 Aegopinella ressmanni (Westerlund, 1883)
 † Aegopinella reussi (M. Hörnes, 1856) 
 † Aegopinella reyi Schlickum, 1975 
 † Aegopinella subnitens (Klein, 1853) 
 † Aegopinella vetusta (Klika, 1891)

References

 Bank, R. A. (2017). Classification of the Recent terrestrial Gastropoda of the World. Last update: July 16th, 2017

Gastrodontidae
Gastropod genera